Pararrhaptica is a genus of moths belonging to the family Tortricidae.

Species
Pararrhaptica capucina (Walsingham, in Sharp, 1907)
Pararrhaptica chlorippa (Meyrick, 1928)
Pararrhaptica dermatopa (Meyrick, 1928)
Pararrhaptica falerniana (Walsingham, in Sharp, 1907)
Pararrhaptica fuscocinereus (Swezey, 1913)
Pararrhaptica fuscoviridis (Walsingham, in Sharp, 1907)
Pararrhaptica leopardellus (Walsingham, in Sharp, 1907)
Pararrhaptica leucostichas (Meyrick, 1932)
Pararrhaptica lichenoides (Walsingham, in Sharp, 1907)
Pararrhaptica longiplicatus (Walsingham, in Sharp, 1907)
Pararrhaptica lysimachiae (Swezey, 1933)
Pararrhaptica lysimachiana (Swezey, 1946)
Pararrhaptica notocosma (Meyrick, 1928)
Pararrhaptica perkinsiana Walsingham, in Sharp, 1907
Pararrhaptica punctiferanus (Walsingham, in Sharp, 1907)
Pararrhaptica pycnomias (Meyrick, 1929)
Pararrhaptica sublichenoides (Swezey, 1913)
Pararrhaptica subsenescens (Walsingham, in Sharp, 1907)
Pararrhaptica trochilidana (Walsingham, in Sharp, 1907)

See also
List of Tortricidae genera

References

External links
tortricidae.com

Archipini
Endemic moths of Hawaii
Tortricidae genera